Douglas Irving Hodgkin is an American political scientist and author. He is a professor emeritus of politics at Bates College in Lewiston, Maine.

Biography 
Hodgkin was born in Lewiston, Maine. Hodgkin received his B.A. from Yale University and his M.A. and Ph.D from Duke University. Hodgkin taught for 34 years at Bates, retired in 2000 at the age of 61. He remains an emeritus professor at Bates.

He wrote books on Lewiston history, including Frontier to Industrial City and Lewiston Politics in the Gilded Age. In 2005, Hodgkin published Fractured Family, a short book on the Maine courts. While a professor, Hodgkin was an activist with the Maine Republican Party. He has been a long-time member of the Androscoggin Historical Society board of directors and of the Lewiston Historic Preservation Review Board.

See also 
 List of Yale University people
 List of Duke University people
 List of Bates College people

References 

Year of birth missing (living people)
Living people
Duke University alumni
Bates College faculty
American political scientists
American political writers
American male non-fiction writers
Political science educators
Yale University alumni
Maine Republicans
People from Lewiston, Maine
Academics from Maine